The 1979–80 Philadelphia 76ers season was the 76ers 31st season in the National Basketball Association (NBA) and 17th season in Philadelphia. They finished with a record of 59–23, their best since the 1967–68 season.

Overview
The team had acquired guard Lionel Hollins from the Portland Trail Blazers after their effort to obtain Pete Maravich failed as he signed with the Boston Celtics. 

In the playoffs, they won the 1980 Eastern Conference Championship over the Boston Celtics 4–1. In the 1980 NBA Finals they would lose to the Los Angeles Lakers 4–2. The series was memorable for Julius Erving's baseline move in Game 4, and Magic Johnson's 42-point effort in Game 6 starting the game at center in place of an injured Kareem Abdul-Jabbar.

Offseason

NBA Draft

Roster

Regular season

Season standings

Record vs. opponents

Game log

Regular season

|- align="center" bgcolor="#ccffcc"
| 1
| October 12, 1979
| @ Washington
| W 93–92
|
|
|
| Capital Centre
| 1–0
|- align="center" bgcolor="#ccffcc"
| 2
| October 13, 1979
| Houston
| W 113–105
|
|
|
| The Spectrum
| 2–0
|- align="center" bgcolor="#ccffcc"
| 3
| October 17, 1979
| @ New Jersey
| W 113–88
|
|
|
| Rutgers Athletic Center
| 3–0
|- align="center" bgcolor="#ccffcc"
| 4
| October 19, 1979
| Detroit
| W 112–104
|
|
|
| The Spectrum
| 4–0
|- align="center" bgcolor="#ccffcc"
| 5
| October 20, 1979
| @ New York
| W 136–111
|
|
|
| Madison Square Garden
| 5–0
|- align="center" bgcolor="#ccffcc"
| 6
| October 24, 1979
| Indiana
| W 132–110
|
|
|
| The Spectrum
| 6–0
|- align="center" bgcolor="#ccffcc"
| 7
| October 26, 1979
| New York
| W 127–116
|
|
|
| TheSpectrum
| 7–0
|- align="center" bgcolor="#ccffcc"
| 8
| October 27, 1979
| @ Cleveland
| W 112–106
|
|
|
| Richfield Coliseum
| 8–0
|- align="center" bgcolor="#ffcccc"
| 9
| October 31, 1979
| @ Atlanta
| L 97–102
|
|
|
| The Omni
| 8–1

|- align="center" bgcolor="#ffcccc"
| 10
| November 2, 1979
| Atlanta
| L 81–85
|
|
|
| The Spectrum
| 8–2
|- align="center" bgcolor="#ccffcc"
| 11
| November 3, 1979
| @ Indiana
| W 120–114 (2OT)
|
|
|
| Market Square Arena
| 9–2
|- align="center" bgcolor="#ccffcc"
| 12
| November 6, 1979
| @ Milwaukee
| W 118–117 (OT)
|
|
|
| MECCA Arena
| 10–2
|- align="center" bgcolor="#ccffcc"
| 13
| November 7, 1979
| Kansas City
| W 110–102
|
|
|
| The Spectrum
| 11–2
|- align="center" bgcolor="#ffcccc"
| 14
| November 9, 1979
| @ Detroit
| L 98–106
|
|
|
| Pontiac Silverdome
| 11–3
|- align="center" bgcolor="#ccffcc"
| 15
| November 10, 1979
| Boston
| W 95–94
|
|
|
| The Spectrum
| 12–3
|- align="center" bgcolor="#ffcccc"
| 16
| November 13, 1979
| @ Kansas City
| L 103–110
|
|
|
| Municipal Auditorium
| 12–4
|- align="center" bgcolor="#ffcccc"
| 17
| November 16, 1979
| San Antonio
| L 105–106
|
|
|
| The Spectrum
| 12–5
|- align="center" bgcolor="#ffcccc"
| 18
| November 17, 1979
| @ Chicago
| L 103–106 (OT)
|
|
|
| Chicago Stadium
| 12–6
|- align="center" bgcolor="#ccffcc"
| 19
| November 20, 1979
| @ San Antonio
| W 118–114
|
|
|
| HemisFair Arena
| 13–6
|- align="center" bgcolor="#ffcccc"
| 20
| November 21, 1979
| @ Houston
| L 94–97
|
|
|
| The Summit
| 13–7
|- align="center" bgcolor="#ccffcc"
| 21
| November 23, 1979
| Houston
| W 113–102
|
|
|
| The Spectrum
| 14–7
|- align="center" bgcolor="#ccffcc"
| 22
| November 24, 1979
| New Jersey
| W 91–82
|
|
|
| The Spectrum
| 15–7 
|- align="center" bgcolor="#ccffcc"
| 23
| November 26, 1979
| Indiana
| W 113–112
|
|
|
| The Spectrum
| 16–7
|- align="center" bgcolor="#ccffcc"
| 24
| November 28, 1979
| Washington
| W 120–102
|
|
|
| The Spectrum
| 17–7
|- align="center" bgcolor="#ccffcc"
| 25
| November 30, 1979
| San Diego
| W 104–101
|
|
|
| The Spectrum
| 18–7 

|- align="center" bgcolor="#ccffcc"
| 26
| December 1, 1979
| Cleveland
| W 117–105
|
|
|
| The Spectrum
| 19–7
|- align="center" bgcolor="#ccffcc"
| 27
| December 5, 1979
| San Antonio
| W 132–120
|
|
|
| The Spectrum
| 20–7
|- align="center" bgcolor="#ccffcc"
| 28
| December 8, 1979
| Phoenix
| W 117–96
|
|
|
| The Spectrum
| 21–7
|- align="center" bgcolor="#ccffcc"
| 29
| December 12, 1979
| Milwaukee
| W 112–91
|
|
|
| The Spectrum
| 22–7
|- align="center" bgcolor="#ffcccc"
| 30
| December 14, 1979
| Atlanta
| L 98–103
|
|
|
| The Spectrum
| 22–8
|- align="center" bgcolor="#ffcccc"
| 31
| December 15, 1979
| @ Atlanta
| L 96–112
|
|
|
| The Omni
| 22–9
|- align="center" bgcolor="#ccffcc"
| 32
| December 18, 1979
| @ Detroit
| W 114–102
|
|
|
| Pontiac Silverdome
| 23–9
|- align="center" bgcolor="#ffcccc"
| 33
| December 19, 1979
| @ Boston
| L 89–112
|
|
|
| Boston Garden
| 23–10
|- align="center" bgcolor="#ccffcc"
| 34
| December 21, 1979
| Houston
| W 117–106
|
|
|
| The Spectrum
| 24–10
|- align="center" bgcolor="#ccffcc"
| 35
| December 22, 1979
| Boston
| W 126–113
|
|
|
| The Spectrum
| 25–10
|- align="center" bgcolor="#ccffcc"
| 36
| December 25, 1979
| @ Washington
| W 93–92
|
|
|
| Capital Centre
| 26–10
|- align="center" bgcolor="#ccffcc"
| 37
| December 27, 1979
| @ San Antonio
| W 118–114
|
|
|
| HemisFair Arena
| 27–10
|- align="center" bgcolor="#ffcccc"
| 38
| December 29, 1979
| @ Houston
| L 100–104
|
|
|
| The Summit
| 27–11

|- align="center" bgcolor="#ccffcc"
| 39
| January 3, 1980
| @ Cleveland
| W 109–108
|
|
|
| Richfield Coliseum
| 28–11
|- align="center" bgcolor="#ccffcc"
| 40
| January 8, 1980
| @ New York
| W 111–108
|
|
|
| Madison Square Garden
| 29–11
|- align="center" bgcolor="#ccffcc"
| 41
| January 9, 1980
| New Jersey
| W 108–105
|
|
|
| The Spectrum
| 30–11 
|- align="center" bgcolor="#ccffcc"
| 42
| January 11, 1980
| Washington
| W 119–106
|
|
|
| The Spectrum
| 31–11
|- align="center" bgcolor="#ccffcc"
| 43
| January 13, 1980
| New York
| W 126–112
|
|
|
| The Spectrum
| 32–11
|- align="center" bgcolor="#ccffcc"
| 44
| January 16, 1980
| Portland
| W 121–110
|
|
|
| The Spectrum
| 33–11
|- align="center" bgcolor="#ccffcc"
| 45
| January 18, 1980
| @ New Jersey
| W 112–105
|
|
|
| Rutgers Athletic Center
| 34–11
|- align="center" bgcolor="#ccffcc"
| 46
| January 19, 1980
| Cleveland
| W 111–107
|
|
|
| The Spectrum
| 35–11
|- align="center" bgcolor="#ccffcc"
| 47
| January 23, 1980
| @ Denver
| W 118–93
|
|
|
| McNichols Sports Arena
| 36–11
|- align="center" bgcolor="#ffcccc"
| 48
| January 25, 1980
| @ Los Angeles
| L 103–124
|
|
|
| The Forum
| 36–12
|- align="center" bgcolor="#ffcccc"
| 49
| January 27, 1980
| @ Phoenix
| L 118–125
|
|
|
| Arizona Veterans Memorial Coliseum
| 36–13
|- align="center" bgcolor="#ffcccc"
| 50
| January 28, 1980
| @ Utah
| L 101–107
|
|
|
| Salt Palace
| 36–14
|- align="center" bgcolor="#ccffcc"
| 51
| January 30, 1980
| Detroit
| W 121–108
|
|
|
| The Spectrum
| 37–14
|- align="center" bgcolor="#ccffcc"
| 52
| January 31, 1980
| @ Houston
| W 110–105
|
|
|
| The Summit
| 38–14

|- align="center"
|colspan="9" bgcolor="#bbcaff"|All-Star Break
|- style="background:#cfc;"
|- bgcolor="#bbffbb"
|- align="center" bgcolor="#ccffcc"
| 53
| February 5, 1980
| @ Indiana
| W 109–108
|
|
|
| Market Square Arena
| 39–14
|- align="center" bgcolor="#ffcccc"
| 54
| February 6, 1980
| @ Boston
| L 110–129
|
|
|
| Boston Garden
| 39–15
|- align="center" bgcolor="#ffcccc"
| 55
| February 8, 1980
| Seattle
| L 94–109
|
|
|
| The Spectrum
| 39–16
|- align="center" bgcolor="#ccffcc"
| 56
| February 10, 1980
| Los Angeles
| W 105–104
|
|
|
| The Spectrum
| 40–16
|- align="center" bgcolor="#ccffcc"
| 57
| February 13, 1980
| Utah
| W 107–85
|
|
|
| The Spectrum
| 41–16
|- align="center" bgcolor="#ccffcc"
| 58
| February 15, 1980
| @ Detroit
| W 114–104
|
|
|
| Pontiac Silverdome
| 42–16
|- align="center" bgcolor="#ccffcc"
| 59
| February 16, 1980
| Chicago
| W 100–92
|
|
|
| The Spectrum
| 43–16
|- align="center" bgcolor="#ccffcc"
| 60
| February 17, 1980
| Cleveland
| W 115–100
|
|
|
| The Spectrum
| 44–16
|- align="center" bgcolor="#ffcccc"
| 61
| February 21, 1980
| @ San Diego
| L 99–104
|
|
|
| San Diego Sports Arena
| 44–17
|- align="center" bgcolor="#ccffcc"
| 62
| February 24, 1980
| @ Golden State
| W 103–100
|
|
|
| Oakland-Alameda County Coliseum Arena
| 45–17
|- align="center" bgcolor="#ccffcc"
| 63
| February 26, 1980
| @ Portland
| W 98–96
|
|
|
| Memorial Coliseum
| 46–17
|- align="center" bgcolor="#ccffcc"
| 64
| February 27, 1980
| @ Seattle
| W 101–98 (OT)
|
|
|
| Kingdome
| 47–17
|- align="center" bgcolor="#ccffcc"
| 65
| February 29, 1980
| Denver
| W 104–103
|
|
|
| The Spectrum
| 48–17

|- align="center" bgcolor="#ccffcc"
| 66
| March 2, 1980
| Golden State
| W 144–99
|
|
|
| The Spectrum
| 48–18
|- align="center" bgcolor="#ccffcc"
| 67
| March 5, 1980
| Indiana
| W 120–113
|
|
|
| The Spectrum
| 49–18
|- align="center" bgcolor="#ffcccc"
| 68
| March 7, 1980
| @ Boston
| L 92–111
|
|
|
| Boston Garden
| 50–18
|- align="center" bgcolor="#ccffcc"
| 69
| March 9, 1980
| @ San Antonio
| W 134–118
|
|
|
| HemisFair Arena
| 51–18
|- align="center" bgcolor="#ccffcc"
| 70
| March 11, 1980
| @ Atlanta
| W 102–97 (OT)
|
|
|
| The Omni
| 52–18
|- align="center" bgcolor="#ccffcc"
| 71
| March 12, 1980
| Washington
| W 105–98
|
|
|
| The Spectrum
| 53–18
|- align="center" bgcolor="#ffcccc"
| 72
| March 14, 1980
| @ Indiana
| L 94–104
|
|
|
| Market Square Arena
| 53–19
|- align="center" bgcolor="#ffcccc"
| 73
| March 16, 1980
| @ Cleveland
| L 109–123
|
|
|
| Richfield Coliseum
| 53–20
|- align="center" bgcolor="#ccffcc"
| 74
| March 17, 1980
| Detroit
| W 123–109
|
|
|
| The Spectrum
| 54–20
|- align="center" bgcolor="#ffcccc"
| 75
| March 19, 1980
| San Antonio
| L 99–105
|
|
|
| The Spectrum
| 54–21
|- align="center" bgcolor="#ffcccc"
| 76
| March 20, 1980
| @ Washington
| L 113–119 (OT)
|
|
|
| Capital Centre
| 54–22
|- align="center" bgcolor="#ccffcc"
| 77
| March 21, 1980
| New Jersey
| W 108–99
|
|
|
| The Spectrum
| 55–22
|- align="center" bgcolor="#ccffcc"
| 78
| March 23, 1980
| New York
| W 112–108
|
|
|
| The Spectrum
| 56–22
|- align="center" bgcolor="#ccffcc"
| 79
| March 26, 1980
| Atlanta
| W 84–81
|
|
|
| The Spectrum
| 57–22
|- align="center" bgcolor="#ccffcc"
| 80
| March 27, 1980
| @ New York
| W 103–101
|
|
|
| Madison Square Garden
| 58–22
|- align="center" bgcolor="#ffcccc"
| 81
| March 28, 1980
| @ New Jersey
| L 92–99
|
|
|
| Rutgers Athletic Center
| 58–23
|- align="center" bgcolor="#ccffcc"
| 82
| March 30, 1980
| Boston
| W 116–110
|
|
|
| The Spectrum
| 59–23

Playoffs

|- align="center" bgcolor="#ccffcc"
| 1
| April 2, 1980
| Washington
| W 111–96
| Lionel Hollins (21)
| Caldwell Jones (26)
| Maurice Cheeks (6)
| The Spectrum12,567
| 1–0
|- align="center" bgcolor="#ccffcc"
| 2
| April 4, 1980
| @ Washington
| W 112–104
| Julius Erving (31)
| Lionel Hollins (9)
| Maurice Cheeks (7)
| Capital Centre18,397
| 2–0
|-

|- align="center" bgcolor="#ccffcc"
| 1
| April 6, 1980
| Atlanta
| W 107–104
| Julius Erving (28)
| Caldwell Jones (13)
| Maurice Cheeks (9)
| The Spectrum10,561
| 1–0
|- align="center" bgcolor="#ccffcc"
| 2
| April 9, 1980
| Atlanta
| W 99–92
| Darryl Dawkins (22)
| Bobby Jones (9)
| Maurice Cheeks (7)
| The Spectrum18,276
| 2–0
|- align="center" bgcolor="#ffcccc"
| 3
| April 10, 1980
| @ Atlanta
| L 93–105
| Julius Erving (26)
| Caldwell Jones (16)
| Caldwell Jones (4)
| The Omni15,617
| 2–1
|- align="center" bgcolor="#ccffcc"
| 4
| April 13, 1980
| @ Atlanta
| W 107–83
| Hollins, B. Jones (20)
| Caldwell Jones (11)
| Maurice Cheeks (5)
| The Omni15,617
| 3–1
|- align="center" bgcolor="#ccffcc"
| 5
| April 15, 1980
| Atlanta
| W 105–100
| Dawkins, Erving (30)
| Caldwell Jones (13)
| Lionel Hollins (7)
| The Spectrum18,276
| 4–1
|-

|- align="center" bgcolor="#ccffcc"
| 1
| April 18, 1980
| @ Boston
| W 96–93
| Julius Erving (29)
| Darryl Dawkins (10)
| Cheeks, Hollins (6)
| Boston Garden15,320
| 1–0
|- align="center" bgcolor="#ffcccc"
| 2
| April 20, 1980
| @ Boston
| L 90–96
| Julius Erving (24)
| Darryl Dawkins (11)
| Lionel Hollins (5)
| Boston Garden15,320
| 1–1
|- align="center" bgcolor="#ccffcc"
| 3
| April 23, 1980
| Boston
| W 99–97
| Julius Erving (28)
| Julius Erving (11)
| Lionel Hollins (9)
| The Spectrum18,276
| 2–1
|- align="center" bgcolor="#ccffcc"
| 4
| April 25, 1980
| Boston
| W 102–90
| Julius Erving (30)
| Julius Erving (10)
| Maurice Cheeks (10)
| The Spectrum18,276
| 3–1
|- align="center" bgcolor="#ccffcc"
| 5
| April 27, 1980
| @ Boston
| W 105–94
| Lionel Hollins (24)
| three players tied (9)
| Lionel Hollins (7)
| Boston Garden15,320
| 4–1
|-

|- align="center" bgcolor="#ffcccc"
| 1
| May 4, 1980
| @ Los Angeles
| L 102–109
| Julius Erving (20)
| Bobby Jones (10)
| Lionel Hollins (8)
| The Forum17,505
| 0–1
|- align="center" bgcolor="#ccffcc"
| 2
| May 7, 1980
| @ Los Angeles
| W 107–104
| Darryl Dawkins (25)
| Julius Erving (10)
| Maurice Cheeks (10)
| The Forum17,505
| 1–1
|- align="center" bgcolor="#ffcccc"
| 3
| May 10, 1980
| Los Angeles
| L 101–111
| Julius Erving (24)
| Caldwell Jones (11)
| Lionel Hollins (9)
| The Spectrum18,726
| 1–2
|- align="center" bgcolor="#ccffcc"
| 4
| May 11, 1980
| Los Angeles
| W 105–102
| Darryl Dawkins (26)
| Caldwell Jones (10)
| Lionel Hollins (13)
| The Spectrum18,726
| 2–2
|- align="center" bgcolor="#ffcccc"
| 5
| May 14, 1980
| @ Los Angeles
| L 103–108
| Julius Erving (36)
| Caldwell Jones (10)
| Lionel Hollins (10)
| The Forum17,505
| 2–3
|- align="center" bgcolor="#ffcccc"
| 6
| May 16, 1980
| Los Angeles
| L 107–123
| Julius Erving (27)
| Bobby Jones (9)
| Maurice Cheeks (8)
| The Spectrum18,726
| 2–4
|-

Awards and records
Julius Erving, All-NBA First Team
Bobby Jones, NBA All-Defensive First Team

References

 Philadelphia 76ers on Basketball Reference

Philadelphia
Philadelphia 76ers seasons
Eastern Conference (NBA) championship seasons
1979 in sports in Pennsylvania
Philly